Uniontown Historic District is a national historic district at Uniontown, Carroll County, Maryland, United States.  The district comprises nearly the entirety of Uniontown and contains a remarkably cohesive and well-preserved collection of houses, commercial buildings, churches, and schools reflecting the development of this agricultural village from the turn of the 19th century through the 1930s.  It is an example of a linear townscape typical of small settlements in rural north-central Maryland during the 19th century.

It was added to the National Register of Historic Places in 1986.

References

External links
, including photo from 1984, at Maryland Historical Trust
Boundary Map of the Uniontown Historic District, Carroll County, at Maryland Historical Trust

Historic districts in Carroll County, Maryland
Historic districts on the National Register of Historic Places in Maryland
Uniontown, Maryland
National Register of Historic Places in Carroll County, Maryland